Green spot may refer to:

 Green Spot (soft drink), a non-carbonated soft drink sold in South East Asia
 Green Spot (whiskey), an Irish pot still whiskey
 Green Spot Co., Ltd., a Thai beverage company, best known for its Vitamilk soy drink